Xanthotype urticaria, the false crocus geometer, is a North American moth in the family Geometridae.

Description

The wings are bright yellow with many brownish spots and blotches.  Males have more of these spots than females.  The wingspan measures 3–4 cm.

Similar species
Similar species in the false crocus geometer's range include the crocus geometer (Xanthotype sospeta) and the rufous geometer (Xanthotype rufaria).

The crocus geometer is larger, is pale yellow, and has little or no brown spotting.

The rufous geometer is a deeper yellow and has a reddish fringe.

Flight
This moth is on the wing from May to November.

Host plants
Here is a list of host plants used by the false crocus geometer:

 Red osier dogwood, Cornus sericea
 Ground-ivy, Glechoma hederacea
 Catnip, Nepeta sp.
 Rhodora, Rhododendron canadense
 Goldenrods, Solidago sp.

References

Moths of North America
Angeronini
Moths described in 1918